Robert Hale Kinzie (February 24, 1840 – February 22, 1936) was a member of the Wisconsin State Assembly.

Biography
Kinzie was born on February 24, 1840, in what is now Racine, Wisconsin. In 1871, he settled in Avoca, Wisconsin. His brother-in-law, Joseph A. Frost, was also a member of the Assembly. Kinzie died on February 22, 1936.

Career
Kinzie was a member of the Assembly during the 1877 session. Other positions he held include Chairman (similar to Mayor) of Pulaski (town), Wisconsin, and justice of the peace. He was a Democrat.

References

External links

Politicians from Racine, Wisconsin
People from Iowa County, Wisconsin
Democratic Party members of the Wisconsin State Assembly
Mayors of places in Wisconsin
American justices of the peace
1840 births
1936 deaths
Burials in California